Arezo TV is an Afghan satellite television network, based in Afghanistan. The channel is available through the Yahsat 1A satellite. It also has a radio station available in Afghanistan.

The channel launched on Nowruz festival in 2007, in the city of Mazar-i-Sharif before expanding nationwide.

References

External links

Television in Afghanistan
Television channels and stations disestablished in 2007